Wanstead Hospital was a former NHS hospital situated on Hermon Hill in Snaresbrook, not far from Wanstead in north-east London.

History
The building was originally constructed to accommodate the Merchant Seamans' Orphan Asylum and was opened by Prince Albert in 1861. A chapel was added in 1863. The orphans moved to Bearwood House in Wokingham and the orphan asylum became a convent in 1921.  The building was taken over by Essex County Council and converted to use as a hospital in 1938. It joined the National Health Service in 1948 but, after services were transferred to Whipps Cross Hospital, closed in 1986. 

The majority of the building was gutted internally and converted into apartments. The hospital's old chapel lay empty until 1995 it was purchased by what was then the Buckhurst Hill Reform Synagogue. The building was refurbished to a high standard and is now the Sukkat Shalom Reform Synagogue. 

The exterior of the hospital was used for the opening credits of the Doctor in the House comedy series produced by London Weekend Television from 1969.

See also 
Healthcare in London
List of hospitals in England

References

Further reading

 

Hospital buildings completed in 1861
Defunct hospitals in London
Health in the London Borough of Redbridge
Buildings and structures in the London Borough of Redbridge
1861 establishments in England